Jana Velďáková (born 3 June 1981) is a former Slovak long jumper. She was born in Rožnava and has a twin sister named Dana, who is a triple jumper.

Her personal bests in the event are 6.75 metres outdoors (Banská Bystrica 2016) and 6.56 metres indoors (Stuttgart 2007).

Achievements

References

External links 

 
 Jana Velďáková at the Slovenský Olympijský Výbor 

1981 births
Living people
Slovak female long jumpers
Athletes (track and field) at the 2008 Summer Olympics
Athletes (track and field) at the 2012 Summer Olympics
Athletes (track and field) at the 2016 Summer Olympics
Olympic athletes of Slovakia
Slovak twins
Twin sportspeople
People from Rožňava
World Athletics Championships athletes for Slovakia
European Games silver medalists for Slovakia
Athletes (track and field) at the 2015 European Games
European Games medalists in athletics
Athletes (track and field) at the 2019 European Games
Competitors at the 2003 Summer Universiade
Competitors at the 2005 Summer Universiade
Competitors at the 2007 Summer Universiade